The list of ambassadors of Japan to Lithuania started when Miyoko Akashi presented her credentials to the Lithuanian government in 2008.

Diplomatic relations were reestablished in 1991 (first time relations where established in 1922).  The embassy in Vilnius opened in 1997

List

 Miyoko Akashi 
 Kazuko Shiraishi

See also
 Chiune Sugihara

References

 
Lithuania
Japan